New Smyrna is the name of:

In Greece:
Nea Smyrni, a suburb of Athens, Greece.

In the United States:
New Smyrna, Florida
New Smyrna Beach, Florida
New Smyrna Beach High School
New Smyrna Beach Historic District
New Smyrna Beach Municipal Airport
New Smyrna Sugar Mill Ruins
New Smyrna Speedway

See also
 Smyrna (disambiguation)